My Neighbor Seki is an anime television series based on the manga series of the same name written and illustrated by Takuma Morishige. The anime is directed by Yūji Mutoh and produced by the animation studio Shin-Ei Animation. The series was broadcast in Japan on TV Tokyo on Sunday nights starting January 5, 2014, followed by a broadcast on AT-X Monday mornings; it was also simulcast by Crunchyroll as  Tonari no Seki-kun: The Master of Killing Time. The series ran for 21 episodes of about 8 minutes each. An original video animation DVD was bundled with the limited edition fifth manga volume released on January 4, 2014. The series was released on DVD in two parts on May 28, 2014, with each disc with a bonus episode. Sentai Filmworks acquired the license to the series on December 17, 2015; the English dub of the series was released on DVD on July 7, 2020 with the episodes premiered on the HIDIVE streaming service on June 11, 2021.

Episode list

OVA episodes

Home release

Notes

References

My Neighbor Seki